This is a list of points in the United States that are farther north, south, east or west than any other location in the country.  Also included are extreme points in elevation, extreme distances and other points of peculiar geographic interest.

Northernmost points

Point Barrow, Alaska  – northernmost point in the United States
Utqiaġvik, Alaska  – northernmost incorporated place in all U.S. territory, population about 4,000
Fairbanks, Alaska  – northernmost city of more than 20,000 residents, and northernmost incorporated city with public road access
Anchorage, Alaska  – northernmost city of more than 100,000 residents
Juneau, Alaska  – northernmost capital city in the United States 
Northwest Angle Inlet in Lake of the Woods, Minnesota  – northernmost point in the 48 contiguous states
Sumas, Washington  – northernmost incorporated place in the 48 contiguous states
Lynden, Washington  – northernmost city of more than 10,000 residents in the 48 contiguous states
Bellingham, Washington  – northernmost city of more than 50,000 residents in the 48 contiguous states
Everett, Washington  – northernmost city of more than 100,000 residents in the 48 contiguous states
Spokane, Washington  – northernmost city of more than 200,000 residents in the 48 contiguous states
Seattle, Washington  – northernmost city of more than 500,000 residents in the United States
Olympia, Washington  – northernmost capital city in the 48 contiguous states
Chicago, Illinois  – northernmost city of more than 1,000,000 residents in the United States
Alaska has the northernmost geographic center of all the states.  North Dakota has the northernmost geographic center of the 48 contiguous states.

Southernmost points

Rose Atoll, American Samoa  – southernmost point in the United States 
Futiga, American Samoa  – southernmost town in the United States
Pago Pago, American Samoa  – southernmost capital city in the United States
Palmyra Atoll, U.S. Minor Outlying Islands  – southernmost point in all U.S. incorporated territory
San Juan, Puerto Rico  – southernmost city of more than 250,000 residents in all U.S. territory 
Ka Lae, Hawaii  – southernmost point in the 50 states
Discovery Harbour, Hawaii  - southernmost settlement in the 50 states
Nā'ālehu, Hawaii  – southernmost town in the 50 states
Hilo, Hawaii  – southernmost place with a population over 25,000 in the 50 states
City and County of Honolulu, Hawaii  – southernmost U.S. state capital and southernmost incorporated place in the 50 states (Hawaii's only incorporated place)
Western Dry Rocks, Florida Keys, Florida  – southernmost point in the 48 contiguous states occasionally above water at low tide
Ballast Key, Florida  – southernmost point in the 48 contiguous states continuously above water
Key West, Florida  – southernmost incorporated place in the contiguous 48 states
Cape Sable, Florida  – southernmost point on the U.S. mainland
Florida City, Florida  – southernmost municipality in the contiguous U.S. 
Miami, Florida  – southernmost major metropolitan city in the 48 contiguous states
Cameron County, Texas  – southernmost point on the Mexico–United States border.
San Antonio, Texas  – southernmost city of more than 1,000,000 residents in the United States
Austin, Texas  – southernmost capital city in the 48 contiguous states 
Hawaii has the southernmost geographic center of all the states.  Florida has the southernmost geographic center of the 48 contiguous states.

Easternmost points

Point Udall, St. Croix, U.S. Virgin Islands  – easternmost point in the United States, by direction of travel
Christiansted, U.S. Virgin Islands  – easternmost town in the United States, by direction of travel
Charlotte Amalie, U.S. Virgin Islands  – easternmost capital city in the United States, by direction of travel
San Juan, Puerto Rico  – easternmost major city of more than 250,000 residents in all U.S. territory
Sail Rock, Lubec, Maine  – easternmost point in the 50 states, by direction of travel and easternmost incorporated place in the 50 states
West Quoddy Head, Maine  – easternmost point on the U.S. mainland
Bangor, Maine  – easternmost city of more than 20,000 residents in the 50 states
Augusta, Maine  – easternmost U.S. state capital
Portland, Maine  – easternmost city of more than 50,000 residents in the 50 states
Boston, Massachusetts  – easternmost city of more than 500,000 residents in the United States
New York City, New York  – easternmost city of more than 1,000,000 residents in the United States
Pochnoi Point, Semisopochnoi Island, Alaska  – easternmost point in all U.S. territory by longitude
Peacock Point, Wake Island  – first sunrise (at equinox) in all U.S. territory
Northern Islands Municipality, Northern Mariana Islands  – easternmost municipality in all U.S. territory, by longitude
Saipan, Northern Mariana Islands  – easternmost capital city in the United States, by longitude
Maine has the easternmost geographic center of the 50 states.

Westernmost points

Point Udall, Santa Rita, Guam – westernmost point and westernmost town in the United States, by direction of travel
Hagåtña, Guam  – westernmost capital city in the United States, by direction of travel
Peaked Island, offshore from Cape Wrangell, Attu Island, Alaska  – westernmost point in the 50 states by direction of travel, and last sunset (at equinox) in all U.S. territories. West of it passes the International Date Line, after which come Russian territorial islands.
Amatignak Island, Alaska  – westernmost point in all U.S. territories by longitude
Adak, Alaska  – westernmost incorporated city in the 50 states
Pago Pago, American Samoa  – westernmost capital city in the United States, by longitude
Cape Prince of Wales, Alaska  – westernmost point on the North American continent
Unalaska, Alaska  – westernmost city of more than 2,500 residents in the 50 states
Honolulu, Hawaii  – westernmost U.S. state capital
Anchor Point, Alaska – westernmost point on the continuous road system of North America
Umatilla Reef, offshore from Cape Alava, Washington  – westernmost point in the 48 contiguous states occasionally above water at low tide
Bodelteh Islands, offshore from Cape Alava, Washington  – westernmost point in the 48 contiguous states continuously above water
Cape Alava, Washington  – westernmost point on the U.S. mainland (contiguous)
Neah Bay, Washington  – westernmost town in the 48 contiguous states
Port Orford, Oregon  – westernmost incorporated place in the 48 contiguous states
Brookings, Oregon  – westernmost city of more than 5,000 residents in the 48 contiguous states
Coos Bay, Oregon  – westernmost city of more than 10,000 residents in the 48 contiguous states
Eureka, California  – westernmost city of more than 25,000 residents in the 48 contiguous states
Corvallis, Oregon  – westernmost city of more than 50,000 residents in the 48 contiguous states
Eugene, Oregon  – westernmost city of more than 100,000 residents in the 48 contiguous states
Salem, Oregon  – westernmost capital city in the 48 contiguous states
Portland, Oregon  – westernmost city of more than 500,000 residents in the United States
San Jose, California  – westernmost city of more than 1,000,000 residents in the United States
Hawaii has the westernmost geographic center of all the states.  Oregon has the westernmost geographic center of the 48 contiguous states.

Interpretation of easternmost and westernmost
There are three methods for reckoning the eastern and western extremes of the United States.

One method is to use the Prime Meridian as the dividing line between east and west.  This meridian running through Greenwich, London, is defined as zero degrees longitude and could be called the least eastern and least western place in the world.  The 180th meridian, on the opposite side of the globe, is therefore the easternmost and westernmost place in the world.

Another method is to use the International Date Line as the easternmost–westernmost extreme.  On the equinox, the easternmost place would be where the day first begins, and the westernmost is where the day last ends.

Still another method is to first determine the geographic center of the country and from there measure the shortest distance to every other point.  All U.S. territory is spread across less than 180° of longitude, so from any spot in the U.S. it is more direct to reach the easternmost point, Point Udall, U.S. Virgin Islands, by traveling east than by traveling west.  Likewise, there is not a single point in U.S. territory from which heading east is a shorter route to the westernmost point, Point Udall, Guam, than heading west would be, even accounting for circumpolar routes. The two different Point Udalls are named for two different men: Mo Udall (Guam) and Stewart Udall (Virgin Islands), brothers from the Udall family of Arizona who both served as U.S. Congressmen.

Highest points

Mount Whitney, California  – highest point in the 48 contiguous states at 
Grays Peak, Colorado  – highest point on the Continental Divide of North America at 
Mauna Kea, Hawaii  – highest island summit in all U.S. territory and the entire Pacific Ocean at 
San Juan County, Colorado  – highest U.S. county based on a mean elevation
(No residents of Leadville live above )
Lake County Airport, Colorado  – highest airfield in all U.S. territory and North America at 
New Mexico State Capitol, Santa Fe  – highest state capitol in the United States at 
Colorado  – highest U.S. state based on an average elevation of 
Mount Mitchell, North Carolina  – highest point in eastern United States at 
Mount Washington, New Hampshire  – highest point in northeastern United States at 
Arikaree River, Yuma County, Colorado at Kansas state line  – highest U.S. state low point at 
Beech Mountain, North Carolina  – highest incorporated community east of the Mississippi River at an elevation of 5,506 feet (1,678 m).
Boone, North Carolina  – highest elevation (3,333 feet, 1015.9 m) east of the Mississippi River of any town of its size (over 10,000 population).

Lowest points

Badwater Basin, Death Valley, California,  – lowest surface point in all U.S. territory and North America, at 
Salton Sea, California,  – lowest lake in all U.S. territory and North America, at 
Furnace Creek Airport, California  – lowest airfield in all U.S. territory and Western Hemisphere, at 
Furnace Creek, California,  – lowest settlement in all U.S. territory and Western Hemisphere, at 
Calipatria, California,  – lowest city in all U.S. territory and Western Hemisphere, at 
9th Ward of New Orleans, Louisiana,  – lowest surface point in eastern United States, at 
New Orleans, Louisiana,  – lowest city over 250,000 population in all U.S. territory and Western Hemisphere, with an average elevation of 
Delaware  – lowest state, with an average elevation of 
Britton Hill, Florida,  – lowest state high point, at 
Lake Superior bottom, Michigan,  – lowest freshwater point in all U.S. territory, at 
Puget Sound bottom, Washington,  – lowest seawater point in the interior of the United States, at

Other points

Most remote point in the 50 states: Ipnavik River, National Petroleum Reserve–Alaska, ;   from nearest habitation.
The southwesternmost point of the contiguous United States is Border Field State Park, California.
The northwesternmost point of the contiguous United States is Cape Flattery, Washington.
The northeasternmost point of the contiguous United States is Van Buren, Maine, 47°14.140'N, 68°01.233'W

Islands

The most remote islands in the United States are within the U.S. Minor Outlying Islands (namely, islands such as Palmyra Atoll and Johnston Atoll).

Lakes

It is also North America's largest lake by volume, at 2,900 cu mi (12,000 km3); it is commonly called the largest lake by surface area when Lake Michigan and Lake Huron are not considered one lake.

Rivers

Extreme distances
Greatest east–west distance in the 48 contiguous states: 2,800 miles (4,500 km)
Greatest north–south distance in the 48 contiguous states: 1,650 miles (2,660 km).
Greatest distance between any two points in U.S. territory: , from Point Udall, Guam, to Point Udall, St. Croix, U.S. Virgin Islands (formerly known as Orote Point and East Point, respectively).
Greatest distance between any two points in the 50 states: , from Kure Atoll, Hawaii, to Log Point, Elliott Key, Florida.
Greatest distance between any two points in the contiguous 48 states: , from North Farallon Island, California, to Sail Rock, east of West Quoddy Head, Maine.
Greatest driving distance between any US territory in contiguous lower 48 states (via US highway system): , from Fort Zachary Taylor, Key West, Florida, to Cape Flattery, Washington.
Greatest distance between any two mainland points in the contiguous 48 states (linear distance): , from Point Arena, California, to West Quoddy Head, Maine.
Greatest east–west distance in U.S. territory [?]: , from Kure Atoll, Hawaii, to Riviera Beach, Florida.
Some map projections make diagonal lines appear longer than they actually are.

See also
Borders of the United States
Border irregularities of the United States
Geography of the United States
Extreme points of the Earth
Extreme points of the Americas
Extreme points of North America
List of extreme points of Canada
Extreme points of Canadian provinces
Extreme communities of Canada
Extreme points of Greenland
List of extreme points of Mexico
Extreme points of the United States
List of extreme points of U.S. states and territories
Extreme points of New England
Extreme points of Central America
Extreme points of the Caribbean
Extreme points of Cuba
Extreme points of South America

Notes

References

Extreme points of the United States
Extreme